Orange County Parks and Recreation is the county park department in Orange County, Florida, United States. It maintains and operates a number of parks, multiuse trails, and community recreation centers.

List of parks
Arcadia Acres Park
Avalon/Mailer Trailhead
Barber Park
Barnett Park
Bear Creek Recreation Complex
Beeman Park
Big Oak Park
Bithlo Community Park
Blanchard Park
Bywater Boat Ramp
Cady Way Trail
Camp Joy
Capehart Park
Charles H. Bronson State Forest
Cheney Heights Park
Clarcona Horse Park
Corporal Patrick Deans Park
Crystal Lake Neighborhood Park
Cypress Grove Park
Deputy Brandon Coates Community Park (originally referred to as the John Young Community Park)
Donnybrook Park
Downey Park
Dr. P. Phillips Community Park: located in the southern part of Dr. Phillips, next to Sand Lake Elementary School. Land bought in 2000, used in 2004 for yard waste dropoff after Hurricane Charley, and opened as a park in 2007.
Eagles Roost
East Orange Neighborhood Park
East Orange Regional Park
East Tangerine Park
Econ Soccer Complex
Fern Creek Boat Ramp
Fort Christmas Historical Park
Fort Gatlin Recreation Complex
George Bailey Park
Goldenrod Recreation Center/Goldenrod Park
Gotha Park
Hal Scott Preserve
Honolulu Park
Horizon West Park
Hourglass Park
Independence Park
Interlaken Park
Isle of Pine Preserve
Ivey Lane Park
Johns Lake Conservation Area
Kaley Square Park
Kelly Park/Rock Springs Run
Lake Apopka Loop Trail
Lake Down Boat Ramp
Lake Lawne Park
Lake Mann Fishing Pier
Lake Pearl Park
Lester Mandell Park
Little Econ Greenway
Long Branch
Magnolia Park
Marks Street Senior Recreation Complex
Meadow Woods Recreation Center/Meadow Woods Park
Millennium Park
Moss Park
Orlo Vista Park
Padgett Park
Park Manor Neighborhood Park
Pine Hills Trail
Pine Lily Preserve
R.D. Keene Park
Randolph Street Boat Ramp
Riverside Acres
Rolling Hills Park
Roosevelt Martin Park
Roosevelt Nichols Park
Rose Place Park
Sandhill Preserve
Savage Christmas Creek Preserve
Shadow Bay Park/Lake Cane Tennis Center
Silver Star Recreation Center/Silver Star Community Park
South Econ Community Park
South Econ Recreation Center
Renaissance Senior Center
South Lake Mann Park
South Orange Youth Sports Complex
Split Oak Forest
SR 50 Boat Ramp
Summerport Neighborhood Park
Taft Ball Field
Taft Park
Tangelo Community Park
Tibet-Butler Preserve
Tildenville Park
Tom Staley Historical Park
Trimble Park
Turnbull Park
Vogt-Meloon Park
Warren Park
Wedgefield Park
West Beach Park
West Orange Park
West Orange Recreation Center
West Orange Trail
Apopka Station
Apopka-Vineland Outpost
Chapin Station
Killarney Station
Winter Garden Station
West Tangerine Park
Wheatley Park
Winter Park Estates Park
Woodsmere Boat Ramp
Young Pine Community Park
Yucatan Park

See also
Orlando Department of Families, Parks and Recreation

References

External links
Orange County Parks and Recreation

 
County parks departments in the United States